Fr. Pacifico Ortiz, SJ, (25 Sep 1913 – 9 Dec 1983) was a Filipino Jesuit priest and academic best known as the first Filipino president of the Ateneo de Manila University, and as a staunch critic of the Martial Law dictatorship of former Philippine President Ferdinand Marcos, especially while he served as the delegate of Rizal province to the 1971 Philippine Constitutional Convention.

References 

Religious workers honored at the Bantayog ng mga Bayani
Individuals honored at the Bantayog ng mga Bayani
Presidency of Ferdinand Marcos
Academic staff of Ateneo de Manila University
Ateneo de Manila University
Ateneans honored at the Bantayog ng mga Bayani